Crime Lords is a play-by-mail game that was published by Gamers Unlimited beginning in 1981.

Gameplay
Crime Lords was a game in which, after the interstellar empire collapsed, the city Var on the planet Taccii fell into total anarchy, and players take the part of crime lords, bosses of part of the city.

Reception
W.G. Armintrout reviewed Crime Lords in The Space Gamer No. 51. Armintrout commented that "I have to recommend Crime Lords.  I enjoyed it a great deal in spite of all the problems.  The game is exciting, the gamemasters are good, and it has the feel of a role-playing game more than anything else.  I just hope they rewrite the rulebook soon."

References

Play-by-mail games